Sophie Marois (born 30 March 2001) is a Canadian artistic gymnast who competed at the 2018 World Championships. She is the 2017 Pan American champion on the balance beam.

Early life 
Marois was born in Montreal, Quebec, in 2001.

Career 
Maross began competing for the senior Canadian national artistic gymnastics team in 2017. That same year, Marois finished in first place on the balance beam at the Pan American Championships. Marois was part of the Canadian team at the 2018 World Artistic Gymnastics Championship. Marois had been named to the team as a reserve, but was called in to compete after Laurie Dénommée injured her ankle days before the competition. The team finished the competition in fourth place, the best finish for the Canadian women's artistic gymnastics program

References

External links

2001 births
Living people
Canadian female artistic gymnasts
Gymnasts from Montreal
21st-century Canadian women